Mårten Renström (born 3 February 1972) is a former professional tennis player from Sweden.

Career
Renström, with partner Roger Pettersson, was the boys' doubles champion at the 1990 Australian Open. He was also a boys' doubles winner at the 1990 US Open, with Mikael Tillström. They beat the Canadian pairing of Sébastien Leblanc and Greg Rusedski in the final.

In 1992, Renström and Tillström were losing doubles finalists at the Dutch Open.

He made the third round of the men's doubles at the 1995 US Open, with Ola Kristiansson. En route, the pair had a win over 13th seeds Trevor Kronemann and David Macpherson.

ATP Tour career finals

Doubles: 1 (0–1)

Challenger titles

Doubles: (7)

References

External links
 
 

Swedish male tennis players
Australian Open (tennis) junior champions
1972 births
Living people
Grand Slam (tennis) champions in boys' doubles
People from Mölndal
Sportspeople from Västra Götaland County